Emilio Arturo Izaguirre Girón (born 10 May 1986) is a Honduran former professional footballer who played as a left-back. He became the new sporting director of Motagua in October 2022.

Izaguirre started his career at Motagua, where he played at for seven years. In 2010, Scottish club Celtic spent £650,000 to sign him. Izaguirre won three awards in his first season in Scotland, being awarded the SPFA Players' Player of the Year, SFWA Footballer of the Year and the Scottish Premier League Player of the Year. He played over 250 games across all competitions for Celtic, winning six consecutive league titles in his first spell at the club, and a further league title when he rejoined for a second spell.

He made his debut for Honduras in 2007, and made 111 appearances. Izaguirre also played in two FIFA World Cups and four CONCACAF Gold Cups.

Career

Motagua
Izaguirre began his career at F.C. Motagua in the Honduran League. He made his league debut on 20 March 2004 in the 3–0 victory over Universidad in Danlí.

On 22 July 2008, he had a 17-day trial with English Championship outfit Ipswich Town, but was unable to play in any matches, having not received international clearance from Motagua. He therefore failed to win a contract and the move fell through. The following April, he was close to a move to Belgium's RSC Anderlecht.

In July 2010, it was reported that Toronto FC of Major League Soccer were interested in signing Izaguirre to a designated player contract, after two stand out performances in the CONCACAF Champions League against the Canadian side, but this move did not happen either.

Celtic
Izaguirre agreed a four-year contract with Scottish Premier League side Celtic on 18 August 2010, subject to receiving a work permit. He signed for a £650,000 fee and was given the number 3 shirt. He made his SPL debut in a 1–0 victory at Motherwell on 29 August, giving a solid performance that drew plaudits from Celtic manager Neil Lennon and Motherwell counterpart Craig Brown. On 19 September, Izaguirre set up Anthony Stokes for the winning goal in a 2–1 victory over Kilmarnock at Rugby Park. On 30 October, he scored his first Celtic goal against St Johnstone, where he intercepted a back pass then flicked the ball over St Johnstone centre back Dave MacKay, before slotting a goal under the goalkeeper. The game ended 3–0 to Celtic, with Izaguirre awarded man of the match for his performance. In Celtic's 3–0 victory over Rangers on 20 February 2011, he set up Gary Hooper's second goal.

In the 2011 League Cup Final defeat to Old Firm rivals Rangers, Izaguirre was sent off in extra time for a foul on Vladimír Weiss. On 6 April 2011, he had another man of the match performance against Hibernian in a 3–1 victory, setting up Stokes for the first goal of the game. In the 2010–11 SPL season, Izaguirre achieved a clean sweep of available senior player awards as chosen by players, organisations and the Celtic supporters. Izaguirre won both the SPFA Players' Player of the Year and Scottish Premier League Player of the Year awards for 2010–11. The judging panel for the latter award described Izaguirre as a "class act", while Celtic assistant manager Johan Mjallby commented that Izaguirre could become one of the best players in his position in world football. On 8 May, at Celtic's award ceremony, Izaguirre picked up the Players' Player of the Year Award. Finally, he was voted Scottish Football Writers player of the year.

Izaguirre suffered a broken ankle in the second match of Celtic's season on 7 August against Aberdeen, requiring surgery which ruled out for between four and six months. On 27 August, he signed a new contract with Celtic, due to run until 2015. Izaguirre returned to training, after recovering from his ankle injury, in December. He made his long-awaited return as a substitute on 2 January 2012 in Celtic's 3–0 win over Dunfermline Athletic at East End Park.

Izaguirre played 32 league games as he won a second consecutive Scottish league title, and also featured in the 2013 Cup final, a 3–0 win over Hibernian on 26 May.

On 30 May 2014, Izaguirre signed a new contract with Celtic, keeping him at the club until 2017. In the 2015–16 season, he was displaced as first-choice left back by 18-year-old Kieran Tierney. Despite what looked like an emotional farewell after the final game of the season against Motherwell on 15 May 2016, Izaguirre told Honduras website La Prensa that he still had a contract to see out and had not had any discussions with the Celtic board. He returned to Celtic for the 2016–17 season and played 12 games, covering for Tierney when the latter was injured.

Al-Fayha
Despite being offered a contract extension, Izaguirre left Celtic at the end of the 2016–17 season and joined Saudi Arabian club Al-Fayha on a two-year contract for an undisclosed fee. His stay in Al Majma'ah lasted just 11 months, however, as he opted to end his contract early. He stated: "My family has found the culture [of Saudi Arabia] to be very difficult. I have a meeting with [the club] to discuss my exit."

Return to Celtic
On 10 August 2018, Izaguirre rejoined Celtic on a one-year deal. At the end of the season, he turned down a further one-year deal, and left Celtic for the second time.

Return to Motagua
Izaguirre signed a one-year contract with Motagua in August 2019. Later that month he suffered an eye injury during a fan riot at a derby match with Olimpia.

International career

Izaguirre was part of the national team in the 2005 FIFA World Youth Championship in the Netherlands.

He made his senior debut for Honduras in a January 2007 friendly match against Denmark. He has represented his country in 17 FIFA World Cup qualification matches and played at the 2007 and 2009 UNCAF Nations Cups as well as at the 2007 CONCACAF Gold Cup.

He was also named in the Honduras squad for the 2010 FIFA World Cup, playing two games against Chile and Spain.

Personal life
Izaguirre is known to live a modest lifestyle and is a Christian.

Emilio had a good 20-year relationship with the late renowned Honduran pastor Mario Tomas Barahona, whom he considered a mentor and who in life was pastor of the Mi Viña Church in Tegucigalpa. Church that Emilio has attended since he was a 15-year-old boy and has remained faithful to Christianity ever since.

Career statistics

Club

International 

Scores and results list Honduras's goal tally first, score column indicates score after each Izaguirre goal.

Honours

Celtic
Scottish Premiership (7): 2011–12, 2012–13, 2013–14, 2014–15, 2015–16, 2016–17, 2018–19
Scottish Cup (3): 2010–11, 2012–13, 2018–19
Scottish League Cup (2): 2014–15, 2016–17

Individual
SPFA Players' Player of the Year: 2010–11
SFWA Footballer of the Year: 2010–11
Scottish Premier League Player of the Year: 2010–11

See also
 List of footballers with 100 or more caps

References

External links

 
 
 
 Honduras - Emilio Izaguirre Sky Sports, May 2010
 

1986 births
Living people
Honduran Christians
Honduran people of Basque descent
Sportspeople from Tegucigalpa
Honduran footballers
Association football fullbacks
Honduras international footballers
FIFA Century Club
2007 UNCAF Nations Cup players
2007 CONCACAF Gold Cup players
2009 UNCAF Nations Cup players
2010 FIFA World Cup players
2014 FIFA World Cup players
2019 CONCACAF Gold Cup players
Liga Nacional de Fútbol Profesional de Honduras players
Scottish Premier League players
Scottish Professional Football League players
Saudi Professional League players
F.C. Motagua players
Celtic F.C. players
Al-Fayha FC players
C.D. Marathón players
Honduran expatriate footballers
Honduran expatriate sportspeople in Scotland
Expatriate footballers in Scotland
Honduran expatriate sportspeople in Saudi Arabia
Expatriate footballers in Saudi Arabia